The Flynt Building is a historic building in Chandler, Oklahoma. It was built in 1902 for William A. Flynt and his wife Laura, who rented it as a grocery store. It was purchased by C.O. Cardwell and F. Murphy in 1906, and it became a hardware store. It has been listed on the National Register of Historic Places since June 5, 2007.

References

	
National Register of Historic Places in Lincoln County, Oklahoma
Commercial buildings completed in 1902
1902 establishments in Oklahoma Territory
Commercial buildings on the National Register of Historic Places in Oklahoma
Grocery store buildings
Chandler, Oklahoma